SD18 (sometimes written SD-18 or SD 18) is the designation of a type of cargo ship, built by Austin & Pickersgill at their yard in Southwick, Sunderland, England in 1980–1981. Only three were built: Murree, Kaghan and Ayubia. The name SD18 stands for "shelter decker, 18,000 tons".

Description 

In 1980–1981, Austin & Pickersgill shipyard in Sunderland built three cargo ships of type SD18 for the Pakistan National Shipping Corporation of Karachi. The type of ship was a development of the highly successful Liberty ship replacement, type SD14. In the light of changing market conditions in the wake of the global containerization, the shipyard was unable to sell any further ships of this type. All three ships spent their entire periods of service with the Pakistan National Shipping Corporation. 

Murree sank in 1989 in a force 10 gale in the English Channel, the other two ships, Ayubia and Kaghan were scrapped at Gadani Beach in 2001 and 2004 respectively.

SD18 ships had aft superstructure and machinery, and four cargo holds with a capacity totalling  grain (i.e. loose material). The most forward cargo hold had a hatch with McGregor single-pull hatch covers, the other three cargo holds had double hatches, which were also sealed with McGregor single-pull hatch covers.  

Their cargo-handling gear comprised six derricks, two of 35t and four of 25t. 

Power was produced by a single Sulzer RND68M two-stroke diesel engine, made under licence by Clark Hawthorn. At the end of the 1980s Ayubias main engine was replaced with a new engine of the same design built by Hitachi Zosen. The onboard electricity was produced by three auxiliary diesel engines, each producing 450 kVA.

List of SD18 type ships

References

Bibliography 
 

Ship types
Ships of Pakistan
Ships built on the River Wear